Changsha Datuopu Airport , or Datuopu Air Base, is a military air base in Changsha, the capital of Hunan Province, China. It also served as the public airport for Changsha from 1957 until 1989, when all civil flights were transferred to the new Changsha Huanghua Airport.

From 1957 to 1989, Datuopu served as a dual-use military and civil airport. It was only capable of handling small aircraft and a few flights per day. Construction for Changsha Huanghua Airport began in 1986, and it was opened on 29 August 1989. All civil flights were transferred to the new airport, and Datuopu Airport reverted to sole military use.

Airlines and destinations

Accidents and incidents 
 On 21 January 1976, A CAAC An-24 (B-492) crashed on approach to the airport upon arrival from Guangzhou, killing all 40 on board.
 On 20 March 1980, another CAAC Antonov 24 (B-484) crashes on approach upon arrival from Guiyang and burst into flames, killing all 26.

References 

Airports in Hunan
Airports established in 1957
Airports disestablished in 1989
1957 establishments in China
1989 disestablishments in China
Transport in Changsha
Chinese Air Force bases
Defunct airports in China